Westerngrund is a community in the Aschaffenburg district in the Regierungsbezirk of Lower Franconia (Unterfranken) in Bavaria, Germany, and a member of the Verwaltungsgemeinschaft (Administrative Community) of Schöllkrippen. From 2013 to 2020, the geodetic centre of the European Union was located within the community's boundaries.

Geography

The community lies in the Bavarian Lower Main (Bayerischer Untermain). With the accession of Croatia to the European Union on 1 July 2013 the geodetic centre of the EU shifted to Westerngrund. It moved again on 1 January 2014 (when Mayotte joined the EU) but remained within the community's borders. A monument site has been set up. On 31 January 2020, as a result of the withdrawal of the United Kingdom from the European Union, the geodetic centre of the European Union moved from Westerngrund to Gadheim, approximately eighty kilometres (fifty miles) away. 

The community has the following Gemarkungen (traditional rural cadastral areas): Oberwestern, Unterwestern, Huckelheim.

History
Today's community of Westerngrund mainly comprises areas that belonged to the Schönborn Amt of Krombach, which in 1806 was mediatized with the newly formed Principality of Aschaffenburg, with which it passed in 1814 (by this time it had become a department of the Grand Duchy of Frankfurt) to the Kingdom of Bavaria. In the course of administrative reform in Bavaria, the current community came into being with the Gemeindeedikt (“Municipal Edict”) of 1818.

Demographics
Within community limits in 1970, 1,454 inhabitants were counted, in 1987 1,584 and in 2000 1,918.

Governance
The mayor is Brigitte Heim (WIR).

Coat of arms
The community's arms might be described thus: Gules a demi-lion rampant armed, langued and crowned azure Or issuant from the base, in his gambes a shepherd's staff in pale of the second, in chief sinister two miner's hammers in saltire argent.

Westerngrund has only existed as a community since 1972, having been assembled out of the formerly separate communities of Huckelheim, Oberwestern and Unterwestern, which all lie in the so-called Westerngrund, a steep-sided dale that became the community's namesake. The lion in the arms, and also the tinctures, were taken from the arms borne by the Counts of Schönborn, who held the area until the Old Empire's downfall in 1803. The staff held by the lion is a symbol of Saint Wendelin, the community's patron saint. The crossed miner's hammers stand for the former silver and copper mining in the centre of Huckelheim.

The community has borne the arms since 24 March 1980.

Economy
Municipal tax revenue amounted in 1999 to €661,000 (converted), of which net business taxes accounted for €28,000.

According to official statistics, there were 74 workers on the social welfare contribution rolls working in producing businesses in 1998. In trade and transport this was 0. In other areas, 715 such workers worked from home. Three businesses were in processing. Two businesses were in construction, and furthermore, in 1999, there were 30 agricultural operations with a working area of 722 ha, of which 408 ha was cropland and 313 ha was meadowland.

Education
In 1999 the following institutions existed in Westerngrund:
Kindergartens: 75 places with 72 children

References

External links

See also
 Kahlgrund

Aschaffenburg (district)